Szenttamás ("Saint Thomas" in Hungarian) may refer to:
Szenttamás (Esztergom), city part of Esztergom since 1895, named after Saint Thomas Becket
Srbobran, town in Serbia (Szenttamás in Hungarian)
Tomești, Harghita, village in Romania (Szenttamás or Csikszenttamás in Hungarian)